Clarence, also known as Clarence Town and Peel Town, was an early European settlement on the coast of Western Australia. It was planned by Thomas Peel, with help from various other colonial backers. The first ship of settlers landed in December 1829, and the settlement was abandoned by the early 1830s.

No firm evidence exists for its exact location. It was thought to be sited in the vicinity of Woodman Point, though recent archaeological discoveries have also found evidence of settlement further south, near Mount Brown in the Beeliar Regional Park. The name was chosen in honour of the Duke of Clarence, the heir to the throne at the time of naming.

Notes

References

External links
 Plan of boundaries proposed for the townsite of Clarence in Western Australia

19th century in Western Australia
State Register of Heritage Places in the City of Cockburn